The Apple Barrel 125 is an ARCA Menards Series East (formerly a NASCAR K&N Pro Series East) race held annually at New Hampshire Motor Speedway.

The track held a second race in the month of September, the Apple Barrel 125, for two years in 2018 and 2019. For the 2020 season, the track was reduced back down to one race, which was this one, and the United Site Services 70, the original race at the track that was run in July each year, was dropped.

In 1996, 2000, 2013 and 2014, the United Site Services 70 (in July) was a  race. The Apple Barrel 125 has always been an -long event.

Past winners

 1995 (1 of 3), 2005 (1 of 2), 2011 (1 of 2): race shortened due to rain.
 1997 (2 of 4), 1999 (2 of 4), 2000 (2 of 3), 2002 (2 of 3), 2007 (1 of 2), 2008 (1 of 2), 2010 (1 of 2), 2013, 2016 and 2018 (1 of 2): race extended due to overtime.
 2006 (1 of 2): race shortened due to time constraints.
 2009 (1 of 2): race shortened due to rain/darkness.
 2020: Race cancelled due to the COVID-19 pandemic.

References

External links

 

Motorsport in New Hampshire
NASCAR races at New Hampshire Motor Speedway
ARCA Menards Series East